Dainora Alšauskaitė (born 22 November 1977 in Zarasai) is a Lithuanian orienteering competitor. She received a silver medal in the middle distance at the 2004 European Orienteering Championships in Roskilde. She completed the 5.3 km course with 21 checkpoints in 30 minutes. 24 sec., just 26 sec. behind the winner Hanne Staff of Norway. It was the first medal won in an adult individual event in the history of Lithuanian orienteering in the summer.

References

External links
 

1977 births
Living people
People from Zarasai
Lithuanian orienteers
Female orienteers
Foot orienteers